The 1978 NAIA Men's Ice Hockey Tournament involved eight schools playing in single-elimination bracket to determine the national champion of men's NAIA college ice hockey. The 1978 tournament was the 11th men's ice hockey tournament to be sponsored by the NAIA.   The tournament began on February 24, 1978 and ended with the championship game on February 26, 1978.

Ed Saugestad was named NAIA National Coach of the Year in 1978.

Bracket
Coliseum Ice Arena, St. Paul, Minnesota

Note: * denotes overtime period(s)

References

External links 
 NAIA ice hockey

Ice
NAIA Men's Ice Hockey Championship
NAIA Ice Hockey Championship 
NAIA Ice Hockey Championship